Kolstad Håndball is a Norwegian handball club found in 1972, and based in the city of Trondheim in Norway. The club is the handball department of the Norwegian multi-sports club Kolstad IL and as an independent sports team in 1996. 

The team play in top division of Norwegian handball, the Eliteserien, since its promotion for the first time in 2015, Their home ground is Kolstad Arena, which has a seating capacity of 2,500 spectators. With substantial new investment, the club has ambitions to become Norway's top team by 2024.

Achievements
Norwegian League
 Winner: 2022/23
Norwegian Cup:
 Winner: 2022/23

Ambition

In 2021, the club secured grocery chain REMA 1000 as their main sponsor, allowing them to secure the signings of a number of star international players, including the THW Kiel centre-back Sander Sagosen, who will join in 2023. Norway head coach Christian Berge began his role at the club in March 2022.

Team

Current squad
Squad for the 2022–23 season

Goalkeepers
 1  Lars Eggen Rismark
 12  Sondre Orheim
 30  Torbjørn Bergerud
Right wingers
 19  Elias Schaanning Thome
 48  Sigvaldi Guðjónsson
Left wingers
 6  Sander Sæterhaug Rønning
 7  Adrian Aalberg
Line players
 5  Henning Bjørkås Limstrand
 14  Magnus Gullerud
 22  Martin Kærgaard Pedersen
 77  Rasmus Mølgaard Lilholt

Left back
 10  Magnus Langeland
 25  Simen Ulstad Lyse
Centre back
 3  Janus Daði Smárason
 4  Vetle Eck Aga
 21  Eskil Dahl Reitan
Right back
 2  Aksel Hald
 13  Gabriel Ostad Setterblom

Transfers

Transfers for the 2023–24 season

 Joining
  Sander Sagosen (CB) (from  THW Kiel)
  Gøran Johannessen (CB) (from  SG Flensburg-Handewitt)
  Magnus Abelvik Rød (RB) (from  SG Flensburg-Handewitt)

 Leaving 
  Eskil Dahl Reitan (CB) (to  Bergen Håndball)

Notable former club players
  Steffen Stegavik

Kolstad Arena
Kolstad Arena is the home ground to Kolstad Håndball.
 Name: – Kolstad Arena
 City: – Trondheim
 Built: – 2018
 Capacity: – 2,500 spectators

References

External links
 
 Kolstad Håndball on Facebook

Norwegian handball clubs
Sport in Trondheim